Experiments in Living is the debut album of Four Day Hombre, and was released on March 13, 2006. It is available on CD only (catalogue number ALM CDA001). The title of the album is inspired by the book Among the Bohemians: Experiments in Living 1900-1939, by Virginia Nicholson.

Track listing 
"The First Word Is the Hardest" – 4:20
"Don't Go Gently" – 4:28
"Single Room" – 4:15
"Flame" – 3:45
"Mr. M" – 4:27
"13th of the Month" – 3:57
"The Boy With the Mended Heart" – 2:57
"1000 Bulbs" – 3:59
"Inertia" – 5:32
"Three Years" – 5:41

References 

2006 debut albums
Four Day Hombre albums